Mariano Akerman (Buenos Aires, 1963) is an Argentinean painter, architect and art  historian. Working as a researcher and a lecturer, Akerman also develops educational activities that encourage free expression and communitarian involvement of participants while considering their cultural background.

Life and education
Akerman studied at the School of Architecture of Universidad de Belgrano (Argentina), completing his formation in 1987.

In 1991 he received a British Council Grant to research the artwork of Francis Bacon at Marlborough Fine Art and the Tate Gallery in London.

Career
In Asia, Mariano Akerman developed the educational series of conferences The Belgian Contribution to the Visual Arts (2005), In the Spirit of Linnaeus (2007), Discovering Belgian Art (2008-9), Raisons d’être: Art, Freedom and Modernity (2010), German Art (2010), and The Gestalt Educational Program (2011).

In the American continent, the series of lectures Art and Identity (2013) includes a conference devoted to Bacon's idiosyncratic imagery—"To be and not to be."

Specializing in Visual Communication, Akerman lectures on modern art at institutions such as the Museo Nacional de Bellas Artes in Buenos Aires, the National Museum of the Philippines in Manila, the Star of Hope School in Taytay, the National College of Arts in Lahore, the Quaid-i-Azam University in Islamabad, UNIRIO and the Pontifical Catholic University of Rio de Janeiro.

Exhibitions
 1986 RG Gallery, Buenos Aires 
 1988 University of Belgrano, Buenos Aires 
 1989 Bank of Boston Cultural Foundation, Buenos Aires 
 1990 General San Martin Cultural Centre, Buenos Aires 
 2005 National Museum of the Philippines, Manila  
 2005 Total Gallery, Alliance Française, Manila 
 2010 Residence of Belgium, Islamabad 
 2016 Alcazar–Copacabana, Rio de Janeiro

Publications 
Akerman is author of  The Grotesque in Francis Bacon’s Paintings (1999) and "Bacon, Painter with a Double-Edged Sword" (2012).

Lectures and Educational Activities
 The Belgian Contribution to the Visual Arts, Manila and Quezon City, 2005.
 Argentinean Art, Manila, 2006.
 In the Spirit of Linnaeus: The Tercentenary Lectures on Science and Art, Manila and Taytay, 2007.
 Discovering Belgian Art, Karachi and Islamabad, 2008, and Lahore, 2009.
 Raisons d'Être: Art, Freedom, and Modernity, Islamabad and Lahore, 2010.
 German Art: Its Peculiarities and Transformations, Islamabad and Rawalpindi, 2010.
 Shape and Meaning: The German Contribution to the Visual Arts, Islamabad, 2010.
 Tradition and Innovation: Art and Architecture as Structures of Consciousness, Islamabad, 2011.
 Gestalt Educational Program: Theory and Design in the Age of New Objectivity, Islamabad and Rawalpindi, 2011.
 Art and Identity, Buenos Aires, 2013.
 Cultural Heritage and Identity, Rio de Janeiro, 2014.
 Vesalius Rio Program: Anatomy of Art, Rio de Janeiro, 2015.
 Tradition and Innovation: Meeting the Visual Arts, Jerusalem and the Holy Land, 2017-18.

Visual Imagery and Design

References

External links
 Un pintor argentino educa a través del arte en Pakistán — EFE, Spain, 20 April 2010
 German Art: Its Peculiarities and Transformations, — German Embassy web site, May 2010
 Shape and Meaning: The German Contribution to the Visual Arts — German Embassy web site, November–December 2010
 Gestalt: Theory and Design in the New Objectivity Age — SwissPak, October–November 2011
 "Mariano Akerman: Bridging Cultures", excerpts from a note by Sara Mahmood, 2011 
 "Mariano Akerman: Bridging Cultures", by Sara Mahmood — Blue-Chip, January–February 2012, pp. 20–24.
 "Enhancing Perception: The Gestalt Lectures and Collage Competition", by Ilona Yusuf — Blue-Chip, January–February 2012, pp. 16–19.

1963 births
Artists from Buenos Aires
Argentine painters
Argentine male painters
Architects from Buenos Aires
Argentine art historians
Contemporary painters
University of Belgrano alumni
Living people